Falkland Islands competed in the 2010 Commonwealth Games held in Delhi.

 Lawn Bowls Gerald Reive and George Paice (Men's Pairs)
 Badminton Sonia Arkhipkina Michael Brownlee Doug Clark Anna Luxton Laura Minto

See also
2010 Commonwealth Games

References

Nations at the 2010 Commonwealth Games
Falkland Islands at the Commonwealth Games
2010 in the Falkland Islands